Sebastiania hintonii is a species of flowering plant in the family Euphorbiaceae. It was described in 1960. It is native to central and southwestern Mexico.

References

Plants described in 1960
Endemic flora of Mexico
hintonii
Cloud forest flora of Mexico